Maurens is the name or part of the name of the following communes in France:

 Maurens, Dordogne, in the Dordogne department
 Maurens, Haute-Garonne, in the Haute-Garonne department
 Maurens, Gers, in the Gers department
 Maurens-Scopont, in the Tarn department